Window Cleaners is an animated short film produced in Technicolor by Walt Disney Productions and released to theaters on September 20, 1940 by RKO Radio Pictures.

Plot
Donald Duck is hoisted up on a roped platform while Pluto is pulling Donald up. Donald's hat and tail feathers get trimmed exposing his bare tail. Pluto easily gets distracted by a flea and lets go of the rope and Donald  falls but the rope gets entangled by the stop sign and stops the platform, Donald lands on a statue horse. Later on Donald throws a bucket of water to wash the window and quickly runs out of water, Donald orders Pluto to wake up but he refuses and Donald gets angry at Pluto, yelling at him and finally throws a brush down the drainpipe and Pluto wakes up and blows the pulley to the wrong bucket full of nuts and bolts and Donald smashes a window and pulls down the window curtain in embarrassment.

Donald is still working when Spike the Bee flies over to the tulip and Donald plays a practical joke on the bee by almost drowning him in water. This proves to be a mistake as the bee gets revenge and attacks Donald who defends himself with a bucket. Donald tries to attack the bee on the building pole and loses balance and falls on the roped platform. Then the bee dives down at Donald who swings at the bee with his mop and misses, Donald spins, gets tangled in the rope and tied up. Spike sees this as an opportunity to sting Donald's exposed rear end. Donald warns the bee not to touch him, but the bee ignores Donald and dives for him, Donald blows at the bee really hard until both Donald and the bee get tired out. The bee lands on the platform. The bee slowly gets up and aims his stinger into Donald's rear end which causes Donald to yell and gets untied from the roped platform and dives headfirst into the drainpipe until his head comes out of the bottom of the drainpipe. Donald yells at Pluto for help but Pluto ignores him and shoves his head back into the drainpipe where Donald continues to scream and goes back to sleep.

Voice cast
 Donald Duck: Clarence Nash
 Pluto: Lee Millar

Production
Window Cleaners is the first cartoon to feature Spike the Bee as Donald's main rival. It is also the first Donald Duck cartoon with an opening theme that was used in more than one cartoon.

Reception
The Film Daily called the short a "hilarious cartoon", saying, "Donald Duck, window cleaner, and his assistant, Pluto, will draw plenty of laughs from audiences in this cartoon."

In The Disney Films, Leonard Maltin quotes film historian William K. Everson, who said, "Disney used height -- skyscrapers, mountains, etc. -- far more than other cartoon-makers, and with more concern for perspective and the convincing illusion of dizzy depths. Height gags in Warner Brothers cartoons and MGM cartoons were always just that -- rapid gags that paid off quickly in a laugh, and without a buildup. Disney, on the other hand, used height much as Harold Lloyd did, to counterpoint comedy with a genuine thrill."

Home media
The short was released on May 18, 2004 on Walt Disney Treasures: The Chronological Donald, Volume One: 1934-1941.

Additional releases include:
 Walt Disney Cartoon Classics: Limited Gold Edition II: Donald's Bee Pictures
 Walt Disney's Funny Factory with Donald Volume 2

References

External links

Donald Duck short films
1940s Disney animated short films
Films scored by Paul Smith (film and television composer)
Films scored by Oliver Wallace
1940 animated films
1940 short films
1940 films
Films with screenplays by Carl Barks
Films directed by Jack King